Œ (minuscule: œ) is a Latin alphabet grapheme, a ligature of o and e. In medieval and early modern Latin, it was used to represent the Greek diphthong οι and in a few non-Greek words, usages that continue in English and French. In French, it is also used in some non-learned words, representing then mid-front rounded vowel-sounds, rather than sounding the same as é or è, those being its traditional French values in the words borrowed from or via Latin.

It is used in the modern orthography for Old West Norse and is used in the International Phonetic Alphabet to represent the open-mid front rounded vowel. In English runology, œ ɶ is used to transliterate the Runic letter odal  (Old English  "estate, ancestral home"). Its traditional name in English is still ethel or œthel.

Latin
Classical Latin wrote the o and e separately (as has today again become the general practice), but the ligature was used by medieval and early modern writings, in part because the diphthongal sound had, by Late Latin, merged into the sound . The classical diphthong had the value , similar to (standard) English oi as in choice.  It occurs most often in borrowings from Greek, rendering that language's οι (= in majuscule: ΟΙ), although it is also used in some native words such as coepi.

French
In French, œ is called  , which means e in the o (a mnemotechnic pun used first at school, sounding like , meaning eggs in water) or sometimes , (literally o and e glued) and is a true linguistic ligature, not just a typographic one (like the fi or fl ligatures), reflecting etymology.

French also uses œ in direct borrowings from Latin and Greek. In such cases, the œ is classically pronounced , or, sometimes, in modern pronunciation, .

In French placenames of German origin (mostly in and around Alsace-Lorraine, historically Germanic-speaking areas that have changed hands between France and Germany (or Prussia before 1871) a number of times), œ replaces German ö and is pronounced . Examples include Schœneck (Moselle), Kœtzingue (Haut-Rhin), and Hœrdt (Bas-Rhin).

In all cases, œ is alphabetized as oe, rather than as a separate letter.

When oe occurs in French without the ligature, it is pronounced , just like words spelt with oi. Note that poêle is itself an etymological spelling, with the ê reflecting its derivation from Latin . If the oe is not to be pronounced thus, then a diaeresis, acute or grave accent needs to be added in order to indicate that the vowels should be pronounced separately. For example, .

Lombard
In Lombard "œ" represents in many writing systems, sometimes along with "u", the  phoneme. For example:  (bat).

English
A number of words written with œ were borrowed from French and from Latin into English,  where the œ is now rarely written. Modern American English spelling usually substitutes e, so diarrhœa has become  diarrhea, although there are some exceptions, such as phoenix. In modern British English, the spellings generally keep the o but remove the ligature (e.g. diarrhoea).

The œ ~ oe ~ e is traditionally pronounced as "short Ĕ" , as "long Ē" , or as an (unrounded) unstressed vowel. These three Modern-English values interchange with one another in consistent ways, just as do the values within each of the sets from the other vowel-spellings that at the Middle English stage likewise represented non-diphthongs — except for, as was recognised particularly in certain positions by Dobson a tendency whereby
 "... long vowels are, in later use, often substituted ... cf. Pres(ent-Day) E(nglish) [iːkənɒmik] 'economic' in place of the popular [ekənɒmik], which (latter) is in accord with the normal rules and must be regarded as the traditional and naturally-developed pronunciation ...".

There are a few words that English has recently borrowed from contemporary French. English-speakers use a variety of substitutions for these sounds.

However, most œ words use the traditional English pronunciation of borrowings from/via pre-modern French and from/via Latin. Examples are listed in the following categories, into which they have been divided by developments in our pronunciation since Middle English.

 An overriding rule is that where œ ~ oe ~ e is followed by another vowel (whatever the position(s) of stress(es) in the word), it is pronounced as a long Ē.

Examples: onomatopœic, onomatopœia, dyspnœa, apnœa, amenorrhœa, diarrhœa, logorrhœa, Eubœa, Bœotia, homœosis, homœopathy; homœopath; homœopathic, homœostatic, homœostasis, homœozoic, homœomorphic, and homœomorphism.

 In open syllables immediately following or preceding a syllable that bears primary or secondary stress, an œ ~ oe ~ e is  pronounced as an (unrounded) unstressed vowel, as in the short Ĭ or Schwa-like sound. Alternatively, especially when clearer enunciation is desired, an additional (secondary) stress can be added, resulting in a long Ē.

Examples: tragœdy, (arch)diœcese; œconomisation, œsophageal; œsophagus, œcologist, œcology, œconomise, œconomist, œconomy, œdema, œnologist, œnology, ..., pœnology, and Phœnician.

 A long Ē can be used for œ ~ oe ~ e in a primary stressed open syllable that lies within the final two syllables of the word (not counting suffixes such as -es and -ing, even if they are syllabic, and lexical suffixes like -cide if they do not affect the pronunciation of the rest of the word).

Examples: subpœna(ing), phœnix(es), (fœticide, which belongs in this category if the first vowel is pronounced as long Ē due to carry-over from the next word,) fœtus, Phœbe, fœtor, pœnal, Crœsus, and amœba.

 A long Ē is used for œ ~ oe ~ e in primary-stressed open syllables that lie in the third-to-final position (antepenultimate syllables) if the final syllable begins with a vowel and the penultimate (second-to-last) ends in a vowel other than o or u (or did prior to a blending of that vowel with the preceding consonant).

Examples: cœliac and Mœsia(n), which (depending on the dialect) equal  and  ~  ~ ~.

 Finally, there are some cases where a short Ĕ  is used, as what Dobson called in the quote above the "naturally-developed pronunciation" though "the long vowels are, in later use, often substituted":

 for an œ ~ oe ~ e lying in a secondarily-stressed (open or closed) syllable not adjacent to the primary-stressed one, as in (con)fœderation, œcologic(al)(ly), œconomic(al)(ly), œcumenical(ly) and œstrogenic;
 for an œ ~ oe ~ e in a closed syllable anywhere as long as it bears some stress (so this overlaps with the preceding category), as in œstrogenic, œstrogen, and œstrus;
 for an œ ~ oe ~ e in a primary-stressed syllable that does not lie within the final two syllables of the word (except for words like cœliac and Mœsia(n), see above).

Examples: Confœderates, (con)fœderate (adj.), to (con)fœderate, fœderal(ly), Œdipal, Œdipus, pœnalty, and fœtid.

The likes of fɶ̯tid, though superficially exceptional here, do indeed belong here in this category because the counting properly includes also final -e that has gone silent since Middle English (and therefore has been left out by some spellings) in those situations where speakers before the -es demise, such as Chaucer (who did not drop it in rhymes), would have had the -e as an intrinsic part of the word (rather than as just a suffix) — save for its regularly disappearing where followed with no pause by a word beginning with a vowel or sometimes .

As less-circumstantial evidence (than this word's modern short Ĕ ) that it contained the final -e, consider both the spelling of its earliest attestation in English recorded by the NED, within "It maketh to blister both handes, & feet, out of which issueth foetide, and stinckinge water." (in a text dating to 1599). And from the immediate ancestor of the word, lying between it and Latin's , -a, -um, namely, Anglo-Norman fetide, attested 13th century.

Other Germanic languages
Old Norse
Œ is used in the modern scholarly orthography of Old West Norse, representing the long vowel , contrasting with ø, which represents the short vowel . Sometimes, the ǿ is used instead for Old West Norse, maintaining consistency with the designation of the length of the other vowels, e.g.  "mothers".

Middle High German
Œ is also used to express long  in the modern scholarly orthography of Middle High German. It contrasts ö, pronounced as a short .

(Modern) German
Œ is not used in modern German. Loanwords using œ are generally rendered ö, e.g. . A common exception is the French word  and its compounds (e.g.  It remains used in Swiss German, especially in the names of people and places.

Danish
Œ is not used in Danish, just like German, but unlike German, Danish replaces œ or œu in loan-words with ø, as in  "economy" from Greek via Latin  or  "beef" from French . œ, mainly lowercase, has historically been used as a typeface alternative to æ in Danish.

Transcription
The symbol  is used in the International Phonetic Alphabet (IPA) for the open-mid front rounded vowel. This sound resembles the "œu" in the French  or the "ö" in the German . These contrast with French  and German , which have the close-mid front rounded vowel, .

The small capital variant  represents the open front rounded vowel in the IPA. 
Modifier letter small ligature oe (ꟹ) is used in extensions to the International Phonetic Alphabet.

 is used as an IPA superscript letter

The Uralic Phonetic Alphabet (UPA) includes .

The Teuthonista phonetic transcription system uses several related symbols:

Encodings
In ISO-8859-15, Œ is 0xBC and œ/ɶ 0xBD. In Windows-1252, at positions 0x8C and 0x9C. In Mac-Roman, they are at positions 0xCE and 0xCF.

Œ and œ/ɶ were omitted from ISO-8859-1 (as well as derived standards, such as IBM code page 850), which are still widespread in internet protocols and applications. Œ is the only character in modern French that is not included in ISO-8859-1, and this has led to it becoming replaced by 'oe' in many computer-assisted publications (including printed magazines and newspapers). This was due, in part, to the lack of available characters in the French ISO/IEC 646 version that was used earlier for computing. Another reason is that œ is absent from most French keyboards, and as a result, few people know how to input it.

See also

Footnotes

References

Bibliography
 De Wilde, G. et al., eds.  "Anglo-Norman Dictionary".  Accessed 4 April 2017.
 Dobson, E. J.  English Pronunciation 1500-1700.  2 vols.  Oxford: The Clarendon Press, 1957; 2nd ed., 1968.
 Jordan, Richard.  .  Heidelberg: Carl Winter's , 1925.
 Murray, James A. H. et al., eds.  A New English Dictionary Founded on Historical Principles: Founded Mainly on the Materials Collected by the Philological Society.  10 vols + an 11th which contains "Introduction, Supplement, and Bibliography".  London: Henry Frowde, 1887–1933.

External links

 

Latin-script ligatures
Phonetic transcription symbols
British English
Old Norse
French language